Vampire pumpkins and watermelons are a folk legend from the Balkans, in southeastern Europe, described by ethnologist Tatomir Vukanović. The story is associated with the Romani people of the region, from whom much of traditional vampire folklore originated.

The belief in vampire fruit is similar to the belief that any inanimate object left outside during the night of a full moon will become a vampire. One of the main indications that a pumpkin or melon is about to undergo a vampiric transformation (or has just completed one) is said to be the appearance of a drop of blood on its skin.

The only known reference in scholarship is Tatomir Vukanović's account of his journeys in Serbia from 1933 to 1948. He wrote several years later:

The majority of Vukanović's article discusses human vampires; vampiric agricultural tools are also mentioned. Though modern readers may be skeptical that such beliefs ever existed, the superstitions of Roma culture are well documented. The Journal of the Gypsy Lore Society has many articles that are collections of Roma tales, presumably oral history. However others are horror stories that allegedly include the direct involvement of the source (e.g., the fatal consequences of disrespecting the dead). In this context, vampire pumpkins and watermelons are not necessarily any more implausible than other superstitious beliefs.

The story was popularized by Terry Pratchett's 1998 book Carpe Jugulum, a comic fantasy novel making extensive use of vampire legends. Pratchett has stated that he did not invent the vampire watermelon story himself. It is found in several other works: Jan Perkowski's 1976 book reprinted Vukanović's account, the webcomic Digger incorporates a field of vampire squash (most of which resemble butternut squashes in appearance),

Vampire vegetables play a central role in the Bunnicula series of children's books written by James and Deborah Howe.

References

Sources 
T. P. Vukanović, The Vampire; published in four parts in the Journal of the Gypsy Lore Society from 1957 to 1960. (excerpts)
(reprinted in) Jan L. Perkowski, Vampires of the Slavs (Columbus, Ohio: Slavica Publishers, 1976)
Matthew Bunson, The Vampire Encyclopedia (New York: Gramercy, 2000)
Annotations for Carpe Jugulum (see the note for page 150).

Romani legendary creatures
Vampires
Squashes and pumpkins
Watermelons
Mythological plants
Slavic legendary creatures
Romani folklore